The men's doubles wheelchair tennis competition at the 2012 Summer Paralympics in London was held from 2 September to 7 September.

Calendar

Seeds

Draw

Key

INV = Bipartite invitation
ITF = ITF place
ALT = Alternative

r = Retired
w/o = Walkover

Finals

Top half

Bottom half

References 
 
 

Men's doubles